María Guðmundsdóttir (9 November 1935 – 14 December 2021) was an Icelandic actress.

She started acting at the age of 60 and was known for Áramótaskaupið, Steypustöðin, Ungfrúin góða og húsið, Næturvaktin, Steindinn okkar, Stella í framboði and Perlur og Svín.

Filmography 
 Pearls and Swine (1997)
 Ungfrúin góða og húsið (1999)
 Stella í framboði (2002)
 Heiðin (2008)
 Dead Snow 2: Red vs. Dead (2014)

Television 
 Konfekt (2001)
 Steindinn okkar (2010-2012)
 Næturvaktin (2011)
 Steypustöðin (2017-2018)
 Áramótaskaupið (2019)

References

External links

1935 births
2021 deaths
Maria Gudmundsdottir
Maria Gudmundsdottir
Maria Gudmundsdottir
Maria Gudmundsdottir
Actresses from Reykjavík